Matthew Victor Pastor (born 2 March 1989) is an Australian film director. His feature films explore Asian Australian identity, and tell Filipino Australian stories. An alumnus of the Victorian College of the Arts, University of Melbourne Faculty of VCA and MCM, his feature film Melodrama/Random/Melbourne had its Australian premiere at the 2018 Adelaide Film Festival. Part one of his 2020 Trilogy of feature films about the COVID-19 pandemic The Neon Across the Ocean had its world premiere at the 44th São Paulo International Film Festival in the International Perspective section. In 2021 A Pencil to the Jugular had its world premiere at the FIAPF accredited 43rd Moscow International Film Festival.

Fil-Aus Trilogy 
The Fil-Aus trilogy are three films exploring Filipino Australians identity.

Part one, I am Jupiter I am the Biggest Planet, is a silent short film set in the red-light district of Manila. Part two, Melodrama/Random/Melbourne!, is a narrative feature film about a young feminist documentarian and her journey documenting the Men's rights movement and Seduction community PUA movement. Part three, Maganda, or (Pinoy Boy vs Milk Man), is an '80s Filipino/Australian B movie throwback about a deranged killer dubbed the Milk Man & the assassin Pinoy Boy on a mission to stop him.

In a review of Melodrama/Random/Melbourne Oggs Cruz of Rappler said:

"A stunning discovery, Matthew Victor Pastor's Melodrama/Random/Melbourne! is a pastiche of many attempts—both somewhat successful or outright failures—to be something. Vague in terms of form and substance, the film, without even perusing its scatterings of plot and characters, is a brash reflection of the waywardness and captivating caprice of the unique millennial culture brought about by cross-border migration. The setting here is Melbourne, a city that the film depicts as one that is undergoing transformation into a bustling center of distinct Asian influences. However, its young and rebellious citizens, heirs of those from a generation that needed to make the city its home, are themselves repelling the waves of new migration, sowing seeds of division."

The film was also an honorable mention in Rappler's 12 best Filipino Films of 2018.

On Melodrama/Random/Melborune!, Bill Mousoulis the founding editor of Senses of Cinema said:
"This is breathtaking cinema that is just extraordinary. It's one of the best Australian films of this decade." He also described Pastor as "the most dynamic young filmmaker I've come across in 35 years of indie film watching in Australia."

Jake Wilson of The Age said:
"In the spirit of Godard and Wong Kar-Wai, local writer-director Matthew Victor Pastor throws every available idea into this wild goose chase through Melbourne after dark... An arresting introduction to a talent going places."

The film premiered at the 2018 Sinag Maynila Film Festival and was awarded Best Original Score (Fergus Cronkite).  The film was also nominated for the 67th edition of the FAMAS Award (Filipino Academy of Movie Arts and Sciences Award) in the music category for his composer Fergus Cronkite (Andrew Tran).

In a negative review, Stephanie Mayo of Concept News Central said:
"Twenty minutes into the movie, I walked out of the cinema. I could no longer endure the film. I thought it pretentious and messy, and the sex talk stilted."

Part 3 Maganda! Pinoy Boy vs Milk Man had its premiere at Monster Fest.
Glenn Cochrane of Fakeshemp.net said, "There isn't a filmmaker in Australia as distinctive or eccentric, and what MVP puts on the screen is the entire inner-workings of his mind. MAGANDA is a culmination of his past work and serves as a self-inflicted exorcism of his mind's congestion."

2020 Trilogy 
He is in post-production on a number of diverse Asian Australian films dealing with social issues unique to the Australian landscape. With these projects currently in post-production If Magazine coined him, "Australia's most prolific filmmaker". 2020 embarks production of his thematic 2020 trilogy capturing the Future, Present & Past of the global pandemic. He explains the process of making the 2020 Trilogy in Issue 97 of Senses of Cinema. "The two films I was working on in early 2020 would eventually become 1 and 2 of the trilogy: The Neon Across the ocean and A Pencil to the Jugular. The rapid changes in society caused me great anxiety and loneliness. The anxiety and isolation are predominant moods felt through the films. The pandemic is not over and globally this is something we can’t even comprehend. Even when these films are completed and released a feeling of melancholy in society will linger, an unresolved pain." The Neon Across the Ocean world premiered at the 44th São Paulo International Film Festival with some of the worlds first corona virus themed films like Coronation (2020 film) by Ai Weiwei. The second installment in the trilogy world premiered at the 43rd Moscow International Film Festival. The film explores some of the social and racial injustices which have arisen during the pandemic. Pastor has said in Philippine Daily Inquirer about the 2020 trilogy "I feel we should talk about these experiences because they encourage people to stand up as opposed to accepting this as normal." The film is unique as it was co-written by international student Lorena Zarate and has a fresh perspective on life in Australia for people who are marginalised.

Filmography

Feature films

Short films

Experimental Works

Awards

References

External links

1989 births
Living people
Australian people of Filipino descent
Australian film directors